Brachioteuthidae is a family of squid containing two genera and around six species.

Species
Genus Brachioteuthis
Brachioteuthis beanii
Brachioteuthis behnii
Brachioteuthis bowmani *
Brachioteuthis picta, ornate arm squid
Brachioteuthis riisei, common arm squid
Genus Slosarczykovia
Slosarczykovia circumantarctica

The species listed above with an asterisk (*) is questionable and needs further study to determine if it is a valid species or a synonym.

External links
Tree of Life web project: Brachioteuthidae

Squid
Cephalopod families